The Greek Operation was an organised mass persecution of the Greeks of the Soviet Union that was ordered by Soviet leader Joseph Stalin. Greeks often use the term "pogrom" (πογκρόμ) for this persecution. It began on December 15, 1937, and marked the beginning of the repressions against Greeks that went on for 13 years. Depending on the sources, it is estimated that between 15,000 and 50,000 Greeks died by the end of this campaign. Tens of thousands more were persecuted during the Deportation of the Soviet Greeks. Some scholars characterize the operation as a genocide against Greeks.

A wave of Greek emigrants from the Soviet Union in 1937–1939 is often considered a consequence of Stalinist persecution of the Soviet Greek national movement.

History
The 1926 Soviet census registered 213,765 Greeks in the country and 286,444 in the 1939 census. On 9 August 1937, NKVD order 00485 was adopted to target "subversive activities of Polish intelligence" in the Soviet Union, but was later expanded to also include Latvians, Germans, Estonians, Finns, Greeks, Iranians and Chinese.

The prosecution of Greeks in USSR was gradual: at first, the authorities shut down the Greek schools, cultural centers, theatres and publishing houses. Then, the secret police indiscriminately arrested all Greek men 16 years old or older. All Greeks who were wealthy or self-employed professionals were sought for prosecution first.

On many occasions, the central authorities sent telegrams to police forces with orders to arrest a certain number of Greeks, without giving any individual names, and the police officers would arrest at random any persons of Greek origin until they reached the requested total number of arrests until the process was repeated at a later date. Estimates of the number of victims vary: according to Ivan Dzhukha 15,000 were executed and 20,000 were deported to Gulags, while  Vlasis Agtzidis puts the number of deaths to 50,000. 

According to Greek Marxist historian Anastasis Gkikas the Greek Operation of the NKVD came as a response to counter-revolutionary activities of a portion of the ethnic Greek population. Gkikas claims that anti-Soviet resistance organizations had coordinated their actions with Metaxist societies in Greece and sought to create an autonomous Greek state in the Black Sea region. They engaged in wrecking, illegally accumulated foreign currency and launched a series of small scale uprisings between 1929 and 1931. Gkikas further claims that the number of Greeks deported to Gulags by 1942 did not exceed 2,610 people.

There was virtually no widespread counter-revolutionary activity among the Soviet Greeks, though there were very few exceptions, such as Constantine Kromiadi, an anti-communist of Greek origin, who later became second in command in Andrey Vlasov's Abwehr detachment during the Nazi German occupation of the Soviet Union in World War II.

Axis collaboration
About one thousand Greeks from Greece and more from the Soviet Union, ostensibly avenging their ethnic persecution from Soviet authorities, joined the Waffen-SS, mostly in Ukrainian divisions. A special case was that of the infamous Ukrainian-Greek Sevastianos Foulidis, an anti-communist who had been recruited by the Abwehr as early as 1938 and became an official of the Wehrmacht, with extensive action in intelligence and agitation work in the Eastern front.

Remembrance
In 1938, 20,000 Soviet Greeks arrived in Greece. Between 1965 and 1975, another 15,000 Greeks emigrated from the Soviet Union and went to Greece. A monument to all Greek victims of the Gulag was unveiled in Magadan in 2011. Unlike many other "punished" ethnic groups, the Soviet Greeks were never officially rehabilitated by Soviet legislation. In the early 1990s, a movement arose advocating the creation of a new Greek autonomy in the Krasnodar region, but it failed to achieve support. One Soviet Greek man, born in 1959, described this outcome with the following words:

Soviet Greeks were officially rehabilitated, among with other ethnic groups by the Russian Federation, amended by Decree no. 458 of September 12, 2015.

See also
 Deportation of the Soviet Greeks
 Constantine Kromiadi
 Greek Autonomous District
 Konstantin Chelpan
 Georgis Kostoprav

Notes

References

Sources

Further reading
Ivan Dzhukha, «Греческая операция. История репрессий против греков в СССР.» — СПб. Издательство «Алетейя», 2006. — 416 с. — (серия: «Новогреческие исследования»). — 2500 экз. 
 
 

Great Purge
Greek diaspora in Russia
Greece–Soviet Union relations
Persecution of Greeks in the Soviet Union
Ethnic cleansing in Europe
Genocides in Europe